The Garman sisters were members of the bohemian Bloomsbury set in London between the wars. The complex lives of Mary, Kathleen and Lorna included affairs with the writer Vita Sackville-West, the composer Ferruccio Busoni, the painter Bernard Meninsky, the sculptor Jacob Epstein (whom Kathleen married), the poet Laurie Lee and the painter Lucian Freud

Biographies

Mary (1898–1979)
Mary Margaret Garman was the eldest of the sisters. Along with her sister Kathleen she ran away to London, where they lived in a one-room studio at 13 Regent Square on the edge of Bloomsbury. Mary was married to the penniless South African poet Roy Campbell from 1924 until he was killed in a car crash in Portugal in 1957.

Kathleen (1901–1979)
Kathleen Garman, the third sister, married Jacob Epstein in 1955. She had been his lover since 1921 and had three children by him. Epstein's jealous wife Margaret had shot and wounded Kathleen in 1923, and encouraged him into multiple affairs in the hope that he would tire of Kathleen and "return home". Six years after Margaret's death, Kathleen became Lady Epstein and, after his death, she was his sole beneficiary. She donated his works to the Israel Museum, and many can now be seen in the Garman Ryan Collection at the New Art Gallery in Walsall. Her daughter Kitty Garman married the painter Lucian Freud, who was a former lover of Lorna Garman, Kathleen's sister and Kitty's aunt.

Douglas (1903–1969)
Their brother Douglas Mavin Garman rose to become the Education Secretary of the British Communist Party until 1950, was assistant editor of The Calendar of Modern Letters, and also a member of the original Left Review circle. His first wife, Jean Sophie Hewitt, had an affair with his sister Kathleen and he became one of the lovers of the art collector Peggy Guggenheim.

Helen (born 1906)
Helen Francesca Garman, number six, married a Provençal fisherman called Polge. Her daughter Kathy (born 1931) married Laurie Lee, who was formerly engaged in an affair with the last Garman sister, Lorna.

Lorna (1911–2000)
Lorna Cecilia Garman married the publisher Ernest Wishart when she was 16 with whom she had a son, the painter Michael Wishart. Throughout the marriage she had affairs. The writer Laurie Lee fathered her third child, and during her affair with the painter Lucian Freud she modelled for many of his paintings and brought him objects, such as a dead heron and a zebra head, to be inserted in his pictures.

See also
List of Bloomsbury Group people

References

Sources 
The Rare and the Beautiful: The Lives of the Garmans by Cressida Connolly, Fourth Estate
Family Profile, book review and photographic images of Mary, Lorna and Kathleen

External links
 The Epstein website of the New Art Gallery, Walsall

English families
People from Walsall
People from Wednesbury
English artists' models
Freud family